WAMX (106.3 FM, "106.3 The Brew") is a classic rock radio station licensed to Milton, West Virginia, serving the Huntington metro area.  Owned by iHeartMedia, Inc.   The WAMX studios are located in Huntington, while the station transmitter resides near Ona, West Virginia, Ona.  In addition to a standard analog transmission, WAMX is available online via iHeartRadio.

History
The station began broadcasting on October 1, 1980, under the callsign WNST-FM.

In May 1985, the station changed to(WAEZ)an easy listening format.

Circa 1990, the format switched to oldies encompassing the 50s, 60s, and 70s. Principal on air personalities included Dave Z (Carlisle) in the morning, Jack O'Shea in the afternoon, and Brian "Doc of Rock" Atkins in the evening.

in the autumn of 1991, WAEZ switched to the Oldies Radio/"Good Time Rock 'n Roll" satellite feed furnished by the Satellite Music Network.  However, O'Shea was allowed to maintain his weekday afternoon slot from 2 to 6 PM and Atkins stayed on as the News Director in the mornings  giving the newscast at the top of the hour during the Zippo in the Morning feed.

in late 1993, the call letters were changed to WZZW. Shortly thereafter in early 1994, the format was switched to a rock format provided by satellite.
in early 1996, the station became The Fox with Morning Host Scott Hesson live and Westwood One Classic Rock outside morning drive.
in 1997, the call letters were changed to WAMX (resurrecting the call letters once used by WRVC in the 70s), the tag became "X-106.3", and the format was changed to progressive rock.
WAMX is now 1063 The Brew, playing classic rock with Scott Hesson back in the afternoon slot

References

External links
106.3 The Brew Online

AMX
Radio stations established in 1980
Classic rock radio stations in the United States
IHeartMedia radio stations